is a passenger railway station located in Hanamigawa-ku, Chiba, Japan, operated by East Japan Railway Company (JR East).

Lines
Shin-Kemigawa Station is served by the Chūō-Sōbu Line (local service) and is located 6.0 kilometers from Chiba Station and 33.2 kilometers from the starting point of the line at Tokyo Station.

Station layout
The station consists of an island platform serving two tracks with an elevated station building located above the platform and tracks. The station is staffed. There are also two express tracks north of track 2; these are used by rapid Sōbu Main Line trains that pass through the station non-stop.

Platforms

History
The station opened on 15 July 1951. The station was absorbed into the JR East network upon the privatization of the Japan National Railways (JNR) on 1 April 1987.

Passenger statistics
In fiscal 2019, the station was used by an average of 22,703 passengers daily (boarding passengers only).

Surrounding area
Kemigawa Station – Approximately 5 minutes on foot
 Higashi Kanto Expressway
Chiba City Hanazono Junior High School
Chiba City Hanazono Elementary School

See also
 List of railway stations in Japan

References

External links

  

Railway stations in Japan opened in 1951
Railway stations in Chiba (city)
Stations of East Japan Railway Company
Chūō-Sōbu Line